This Is Jazz is a mid-priced series of jazz albums issued by Legacy Recordings from 1996 to 1998 in association with the Columbia (CK numbers) and Epic (EK numbers) divisions of Sony Music Entertainment. Each album features a different artist from the Columbia/Epic stable. Each album is titled This Is Jazz followed by the number in the series. 

The position of each album in the series is not consistent with the order of the catalog numbers (although the second half of the series begins to fall into somewhat sequential order). Many of these albums have since been reissued without the number. Due to the breadth of their careers, some artists had multiple releases in the series. Their later releases are identified by the focus of each additional release.

Releases

References

Legacy Recordings albums
Jazz albums by American artists